Muscidideicus is a genus of flies in the family Dolichopodidae. It contains a single species, Muscidideicus praetextatus, which is found only in the Western Palaearctic.

References

Dolichopodinae
Dolichopodidae genera
Diptera of Europe
Monotypic Diptera genera
Taxa named by Theodor Becker